Koteshwar, located in the Uttarakhand state of India, is the site of a Hindu temple dedicated to Koteswar Mahadev. Its around 3 km north of Rudraprayag. Every year, a fair is held in Koteswar on the day of Makar Sankranti.

Hindu temples in Uttarakhand
Rudraprayag district